Ernst Werner Siemens (von Siemens from 1888;  ; ; 13 December 1816 – 6 December 1892) was a German electrical engineer, inventor and industrialist. Siemens's name has been adopted as the SI unit of electrical conductance, the siemens. He founded the electrical and telecommunications conglomerate Siemens.

Biography

Early years

Ernst Werner Siemens was born in Lenthe, today part of Gehrden, near Hannover, in the Kingdom of Hanover in the German Confederation, the fourth child (of fourteen) of a tenant farmer of the Siemens family, an old family of Goslar, documented since 1384. He was a brother of Carl Heinrich von Siemens and Carl Wilhelm Siemens, sons of Christian Ferdinand Siemens (31 July 1787 – 16 January 1840) and wife Eleonore Deichmann (1792 – 8 July 1839).

Middle years
After finishing school, Siemens intended to study at the Bauakademie Berlin. However, since his family was highly indebted and thus could not afford to pay the tuition fees, he chose to join the Prussian Military Academy's School of Artillery and Engineering, between the years 1835–1838, instead, where he received his officers training. Siemens was thought of as a good soldier, receiving various medals, and contributing to the invention of electrically-charged sea mines, which were used to combat a Danish blockade of Kiel.

Upon returning home from war, he chose to work on perfecting technologies that had already been established and eventually became known worldwide for his advances in various technologies. In 1843 he sold the rights to his first invention to Elkington of Birmingham. Siemens invented a telegraph that used a needle to point to the right letter, instead of using Morse code. Based on this invention, he founded the company Telegraphen-Bauanstalt von Siemens & Halske on 1 October 1847, with the company opening a workshop on 12 October.

The company was internationalised soon after its founding. One brother of Werner represented him in England (Sir William Siemens) and another in St. Petersburg, Russia (Carl von Siemens), each earning recognition.  Following his industrial career, he was ennobled in 1888, becoming Werner von Siemens. He retired from his company in 1890 and died in 1892 in Berlin.

The company, reorganized as Siemens & Halske AG, Siemens-Schuckertwerke and – since 1966 – Siemens AG was later led by his brother Carl, his sons Arnold, Wilhelm, and Carl Friedrich, his grandsons Hermann and Ernst and his great-grandson Peter von Siemens. Siemens AG is one of the largest electrotechnological firms in the world. The von Siemens family still owns 6% of the company shares (as of 2013) and holds a seat on the supervisory board, being the largest shareholder.

Later years
Apart from the pointer telegraph, Siemens made sufficient contributions to the development of electrical engineering that he became known as the founding father of the discipline in Germany. He built the world's first electric elevator in 1880. His company produced the tubes with which Wilhelm Conrad Röntgen investigated x-rays. He claimed invention of the dynamo although others invented it earlier. On 14 December 1877 he received German patent No. 2355 for an electromechanical "dynamic" or moving-coil transducer, which was adapted by A. L. Thuras and E. C. Wente for the Bell System in the late 1920s for use as a loudspeaker. Wente's adaptation was issued  in 1929.

In May 1881, Siemens & Halske inaugurated the world's first electric tram service, in the Berlin suburb of Groß-Lichterfelde. Siemens is also the father of the trolleybus, which he initially tried and tested on 29 April 1882, using his "Elektromote".

Personal life
He was married twice: first in 1852 to Mathilde Drumann (died 1 July 1867), the daughter of the historian Wilhelm Drumann; second in 1869 to his relative Antonie Siemens (1840–1900). His children from first marriage were Arnold von Siemens and Georg Wilhelm von Siemens, and his children from second marriage were Hertha von Siemens (1870 – 5 January 1939), married in 1899 to Carl Dietrich Harries, and Carl Friedrich von Siemens.

Siemens was an advocate of social democracy, and he hoped that industrial development would not be used in favour of capitalism, stating:

He also rejected the claim that science leads to materialism, stating instead:

Commemoration
Werner von Siemens' portrait appeared on the  banknote issued by the Reichsbank from 1929 until 1939. Printing ceased in 1939 but the note remained in circulation until the issue of the Deutsche Mark on 21 June 1948.

In 1923, German botanist Ignatz Urban published Siemensia, which is a monotypic genus of flowering plant from Cuba belonging to the family Rubiaceae and was named in honor of Werner von Siemens.

U.S. Patents
  — Electric railway (21 July 1885)
  — Electric railway (20 April 1886)
  — Electric meter (19 November 1889)
  — Electric meter (20 May 1890)
  — Electric railway (22 May 1894)
  — Method of and apparatus for extracting gold from its ores (22 March 1898)

See also
 Friedrich von Hefner-Alteneck—one of Siemens's aides
 Werner von Siemens Ring Award
 German inventors and discoverers
 History of electrical engineering
 Timeline of the electric motor
 Bow collector
 Dielectric barrier discharge
 Double-T armature
 Dynamo
 Electric bell
 Electric locomotive
 Electric generator
 Electromote
 Elevator
 Experimental three-phase railcar
 Microplasma
 Phase plug
 Siemens mercury unit
 Trolleybus

References

Further reading
Shaping the Future. The Siemens Entrepreneurs 1847–2018. Ed. Siemens Historical Institute, Hamburg 2018, .
Werner von Siemens, Lebenserinnerungen, Berlin, 1892 (reprinted as Mein Leben, Zeulenroda, 1939).
 Werner von Siemens, Scientific & Technical Papers of Werner von Siemens. Vol. 1: Scientific Papers and Addresses, London, 1892; Vol. 2: Technical Papers, London, 1895.
 Sigfrid von Weiher, Werner von Siemens, A Life in the Service of Science, Technology and Industry, Göttingen, 1975.
 Wilfried Feldenkirchen, Werner von Siemens, Inventor and International Entrepreneur. Columbus, Ohio, 1994.
 Nathalie von Siemens, A Brimming Spirit. Werner von Siemens in Letters. A Modern Entrepreneurial History, Murmann Publishers, 2016, .
Lifelines: Werner von Siemens, Vol. 5, ed. Siemens Historical Institute, Berlin 2016

External links

 Biography, Siemens Corporate Archives
 Loudspeaker History (U. of San Diego)
 Short biography and bibliography in the Virtual Laboratory of the Max Planck Institute for the History of Science
 
 
 

 
1816 births
1892 deaths
19th-century German engineers
German company founders
German industrialists
19th-century German businesspeople
German electrical engineers
German railway mechanical engineers
German untitled nobility
Members of the Prussian Academy of Sciences
Members of the Prussian House of Representatives
People from Gehrden
People from the Kingdom of Hanover
Recipients of the Pour le Mérite (civil class)
Werner
Werner
Sustainable transport pioneers